Shahrestanak (also Romanized as Shahrestānak; also known as Shahrābād) is a village in Zam Rural District, Pain Jam District, Torbat-e Jam County, Razavi Khorasan Province, Iran. At the 2006 census, its population was 829, in 184 families.

References 

Populated places in Torbat-e Jam County